Bandhu Mohanty (1977) is an Odia mythological film  directed by Nitai Palit. Gopal Chotrai penned the dialogue of the film.

Synopsis
Bandhu Mohanty is a devotee of God Jagganath. He lives with his wife and children and maintains his livelihood by begging. When there is a famine in the village, he comes to Puri with his wife and children. Soon, they can not find food anywhere. When his wife asks him to pray to end their starvation, Bandhu prays to god, who helps him. Jagganath listens to his devotee's prayers and asks Goddess Lakshmi to meet their needs.

Cast
 Govind Tej	... 	Bandhu Mohanty
 Shanti Swaroop  ... 	God Jaganath
 Dhira Biswal	... 	King Gajapati
 Anita Das ... Goddess Lakshmi
 Banaja Mohanty	 		
 Lila Dulali	
 Bhim Singh		
 Biren Routrai	
 Prafula Misra			
 Sagarika

Soundtrack
The music for the film is composed by Prafulla Kar. He was awarded as Best  music composer for this film in Odisha State Film Awards

Box office
The Film got success and became a hit.

Awards
Odisha State Film Awards 1977
 Best Film
 Best Director - Nitai Palit
 Best Actor - Gobind Tej
 Best Music Director - Prafulla Kar

References

External links
 

1977 films
1970s Odia-language films